Tikiri Suwanda is a 2010 Sri Lankan Sinhala family drama film directed by Sunil Aruna Weerasiri and produced by Kanthi Weerasiri for Aruna Kanthi Films. It stars Maleesha Samaratunga and Pramodh Mihiranga Weerasiri in lead roles along with Joe Abeywickrama and Jayalal Rohana. Music composed by Rohana Weerasinghe. It is the 1147th Sri Lankan film in the Sinhala cinema.

The film was shot around Narammala area.

Plot

Cast
 Maleesha Samaratunga as Tikiri
 Pramodh Mihiranga Weerasiri as Ramesh
 Joe Abeywickrama as Devendra, Samanmalee's father
 Anula Karunathilaka as Samanmalee's mother
 Rodney Warnakula as Suran
 Janaka Ranasinghe as Parakku
 Jayalal Rohana as Rajasinghe Chulodara aka Baby
 Giriraj Kaushalya as Alphonsu
 Duleeka Marapana as Samanmalee
 Ramya Wanigasekara as Tikiri's granny Rosalin
 Priyantha Seneviratne as Gurunnanse
 Sarath Kothalawala as Gas Banda
 Upeksha Swarnamali as Nilmini
 Sarath Chandrasiri as Chandare
 Nirdha Uyanheva as Jasmine
 Anura Bandara Rajaguru as Sirimangala Kapuwa, the match-maker
 Pramudi Karunaratne as Anjula
 Saranapala Jayasuriya as Chief monk

Songs

References

2010 films
2010s Sinhala-language films
2010 drama films
Sri Lankan drama films